Eungella Dam is an earth and rockfill dam in the locality of Eungella Dam, Mackay Region, Queensland, Australia. It is one of Queensland's freshwater fisheries. Eungella has made a name for producing extra oversized sooty grunter and more recently barramundi.

SunWater is undertaking a dam spillway capacity upgrade program to ensure the highest level of safety for the dams is maintained. The spillway will be upgraded in the longer term.

History
Eungella Dam was constructed in 1969 to meet the requirements of a thermal power station at Collinsville and the town water requirement of Collinsville and Scottsville. It also supplies water to towns and coalfields at Glendon and Moranbah.

The dam reached its lowest level of 10.96% in January 2005, and maximum recorded level of 127.08% in April 1989 as a result of heavy rain from Tropical Cyclone Aivu.

Attractions
Camping is the main reason people come to Eungella Dam, as well as fishing. There are small campsites to set up around the area and small facilities such as drop-down toilets and rubbish bins. Campfires are allowed on the sites. There is plenty of firewood around the area to use, and leaves as well.

Fishing
A Stocked Impoundment Permit is required to fish in the dam.

See also
Eungella National Park

References

Reservoirs in Queensland
North Queensland
Dams completed in 1969
Dams in Queensland